The Mirchi Music Award for Upcoming Music Composer of The Year is given yearly by Radio Mirchi as a part of its annual Mirchi Music Awards for Hindi films, to recognise an upcoming music director who has delivered an outstanding performance in a film song. The award ceremony was started in 2008 to honour the best of Hindi film music.

Winners and nominees 
In the following table, the years are listed as per presenter's convention, and generally correspond to the year of film release in India. The ceremonies are always held the following year.

2000s

2010s

2020s

See also
 Mirchi Music Awards
 Bollywood
 Cinema of India

References

External links 
 

Mirchi Music Awards
Indian music awards